Beatriz Corredor Sierra (b. Madrid, 1 July 1968) is a Spanish lawyer and politician serving as Member of the Congress of Deputies and chair of the Committee on Justice since 2019. Outside of her parliamentary duties, she chairs the Pablo Iglesias Foundation, a non-profit organization named after the PSOE founder Pablo Iglesias Posse.

From April 14, 2008 to October 20, 2010 she served as Minister of Housing.

References

1968 births
21st-century Spanish women politicians
Autonomous University of Madrid alumni
Living people
Madrid city councillors (2007–2011)
Members of the 13th Congress of Deputies (Spain)
Politicians from Madrid
Housing ministers of Spain
Spanish Socialist Workers' Party politicians
Women government ministers of Spain
Women members of the Congress of Deputies (Spain)
Members of the 14th Congress of Deputies (Spain)